In mathematics, Nambu mechanics is a generalization of Hamiltonian mechanics involving multiple Hamiltonians.  Recall that Hamiltonian mechanics is based upon the flows generated by a smooth Hamiltonian over a symplectic manifold. The flows are symplectomorphisms and hence obey Liouville's theorem. This was soon generalized to flows generated by a Hamiltonian over a Poisson manifold.  In 1973, Yoichiro Nambu suggested a generalization involving Nambu-Poisson manifolds with more than one Hamiltonian.

Nambu bracket 
the Nambu bracket,

which acts as a derivation

whence the Filippov Identities (FI),  (evocative of  the  Jacobi identities,
but unlike them, not antisymmetrized in all arguments, for   ):

 

so that    acts as a generalized derivation over the -fold product .

Hamiltonians and flow 
There are N − 1 Hamiltonians, generating an incompressible flow,

The generalized phase-space velocity is divergenceless, enabling Liouville's theorem. The case   reduces to  a Poisson manifold, and conventional Hamiltonian mechanics.

For larger even , the  Hamiltonians identify with the maximal number of independent invariants of motion (cf. Conserved quantity) characterizing a superintegrable system which evolves in -dimensional phase space. Such systems are also describable by conventional Hamiltonian dynamics; but their description in the framework of Nambu mechanics is substantially more elegant and intuitive, as all invariants enjoy the same geometrical status as the Hamiltonian: the trajectory in phase space is the intersection of the  hypersurfaces specified by these invariants. Thus, the flow is perpendicular to all  gradients of these Hamiltonians, whence parallel to  the generalized cross product specified by the respective Nambu bracket.

Nambu mechanics can be extended to fluid dynamics, where the resulting Nambu brackets are non-canonical and the Hamiltonians are identified with the Casimir of the system, such as enstrophy or helicity   
 
Quantizing Nambu dynamics leads to intriguing structures which coincide with conventional quantization ones when superintegrable systems are involved—as they must.

See also
 Hamiltonian mechanics
 Symplectic manifold
 Poisson manifold
 Poisson algebra
 Integrable system
 Conserved quantity
 Hamiltonian Fluid Mechanics

Notes

References 

Hamiltonian mechanics
Mathematical physics
Theoretical physics